The Week is a weekly news magazine with editions in the United Kingdom and the United States.

The Week may also refer to:

 The Week (1933), radical weekly scandal sheet published by Claud Cockburn from 1933 until 1941
 The Week (1964), socialist newsweekly edited by Pat Jordan and published from 1964 until 1968
 The Week (Brisbane), Australian newspaper published from 1876 to 1934
 The Week (Canadian magazine), literary and political magazine published from 1883 to 1896
 The Week (Indian magazine), news magazine founded in 1982

See also
Theweek, free weekly newspaper in Oman
 This Week (disambiguation)